Velocity 2X is a shoot 'em up video game developed and published by FuturLab for the PlayStation 4 and PlayStation Vita. The developers signed with Sony to create titles for the Vita in 2012, as a result of success of the first game.

Gameplay

Plot

Following the events of the previous game, Lt. Kai Tana drifts unconscious in a distant corner of the galaxy, partially fused with the self-repairing systems of her ship. She awakens to find herself a prisoner of the Vokh Empire, who plan to use the teleportation capabilities of her ship - and of her new cyborg body - to expand across the galaxy. A captive alien scientist helps her escape and recover her ship, and the two set out on a mission to return Tana to her home planet while stopping the Vokh Empire in its tracks.

Development

Reception

Velocity 2X has been met with critical acclaim. Review aggregator site Metacritic assigned a score of 90 out of 100 for the PlayStation Vita version and 86 out of 100 for the PlayStation 4 version. Eurogamer's Simon Parkin rated the game an 8/10 saying, "Despite the game's dipped-nose poise, its obsession with speed and clocks, it rewards those who take their time, who perfect their technique on each stage, and who savour an arcade game that's been lovingly embellished and expanded to its full and likely final potential."
IGN's Vince Ingenito rated the game 9 out of 10 with the verdict being: "Velocity 2X successfully builds upon the speed of the original with its awesome new side-scrolling sections."

References

External links
 Game website

2014 video games
Linux games
MacOS games
PlayStation 4 games
PlayStation Vita games
PlayStation Network games
Nintendo Switch games
Shoot 'em ups
Video games developed in the United Kingdom
Video games featuring female protagonists
Video games scored by Joris de Man
Windows games
Xbox One games
Sierra Entertainment games
Curve Games games
Single-player video games